Lansdell is a surname. Notable people with the surname include:

Elissa Lansdell, Canadian television personality 
Grenny Lansdell (1918–1984), American football halfback 
Henry Lansdell (1841–1919), British Anglican priest
Kathleen Annie Lansdell (1888–1967), South African painter and illustrator